Club Sportif Sedan Ardennes, commonly referred to as CS Sedan or simply Sedan, is a French association football club based in Sedan. The club was formed in 1919 and plays its home matches at the Stade Louis Dugauguez located within the city.

History
The club had its best period of success during the 1950s and 1960s. Sedan won the Coupe de France twice, in 1956 and 1961, and spent the entire decade of the 1960s in the top flight.

In 2012, in spite of being on pace to return to the top division, owner Pascal Urano stopped funding the club. CS Sedan finished in the relegation places for the 2012-13 season and declared bankruptcy, ultimately being demoted two divisions instead of one.

Colours and badge 
Sedan's home strip always includes red and green, and this is reflected in the club badge. The badge also incorporates the image of a wild boar, a symbol of the Ardennes region, hence the club's nickname is Les Sangliers (the wild boars).

Supporters 
Sedan's fanbase is mainly drawn from the surrounding Ardennes region, and particular rivalry is reserved for the derby with nearby club Stade Reims. Although not known for outbreaks of hooliganism, a Sedan home game against Paris Saint Germain in 2007 was widely reported following the arrival of Dutch football hooligans from Utrecht and their ensuing fight with PSG fans.

Stadium 
 Name: Stade Louis Dugauguez
 Inauguration date: 10 October 2000
 Capacity: 24,389
 Record attendance: 23,130 (Sedan vs Guingamp, 12 May 2006)

League Performance 

 Ligue 1: 1955–1971, 1972–1974, 1999–2003, 2006–2007
 Ligue 2: 1953–1955, 1971–1972, 1974–1976, 1983–1986, 1991–1995, 1998–1999, 2003–2006, 2007–2013
 National: 1976–1983, 1986–1991, 1995–1998, 2015–2017, 2021-
 CFA / National 2: 1950–1953, 2014–2015, 2017–2020
 CFA 2: 2013–14

Players

Current squad 
As of 31 January 2023.

Retired numbers 
29 -  David Di Tommaso, defender (2000–04) - posthumous honour.

Notable players 
Below are the notable former players who have represented Sedan in league and international competition since the club's foundation in 1919. To appear in the section below, a player must have played in at least 80 official matches for the club or represented the national team for which the player is eligible during his stint with Sedan or following his departure.

For a complete list of CS Sedan Ardennes players, see :Category:CS Sedan Ardennes players.

 Mustapha Dahleb
 Nadir Belhadj
 Mohamed Salem
 Ivica Osim
 Modeste M'bami
 Pius Ndiefi
 Marcus Mokaké
 Michaël Ciani
 Louis Dugauguez
 Yves Herbet
 Roger Lemerre
 Henri Camara
 Salif Diao
 Džoni Novak

Coaches

Honours 
Ligue 2
Champions (1): 1955
Championnat National
Champions (1): 1990
Championnat de France amateur
Champions (1): 1951
Coupe de France
Champions (2): 1956, 1961
Runners-up (3): 1965, 1999, 2005
Trophée des champions
Champions (1): 1956
Runners-up (1): 1961

Notable supporters 
 Élise Bussaglia
 Roger Lemerre

External links 
Official website #2 (?)
Official twitter
facebook
instagram

References 

 
Sport in Ardennes (department)
Sedan
1919 establishments in France
Sedan, Ardennes
Football clubs in Grand Est
Ligue 1 clubs